Aaron Garcia (born October 28, 1970) is a former professional American football quarterback who played 19 seasons in the Arena Football League (AFL), from 1995 to 2014. He played college football at Washington State University before transferring to California State University, Sacramento. After retiring from the AFL, Garcia was named the head coach of the Las Vegas Outlaws in September 2014, and was formally introduced as the head coach of the Outlaws on October 11, 2014. Garcia is married to Bryn Garcia and has five children, Gigi, Bella, Anthony, Christian, and Jaxon.

Born in Sacramento, California, Garcia attended high school in Sacramento at Grant Union High School. After graduation from high school in 1988, Garcia enrolled at Washington State University and played quarterback for the Cougars, starting for two seasons. He transferred to California State University, Sacramento in 1992, where he started for two seasons.

After going undrafted in the 1995 NFL Draft, Garcia was encouraged to try playing in the Canadian Football League (CFL) or the AFL to gain more scouting exposure for an opportunity at the National Football League (NFL). He signed with the Arizona Rattlers and became their starting quarterback in 1995. In his career, Garcia has also played for the Connecticut Coyotes, New Jersey Red Dogs, Iowa Barnstormers, New York Dragons, Jacksonville Sharks, San Antonio Talons, San Jose SaberCats Orlando Predators and Los Angeles KISS. Garcia would go on to set AFL records for passing yards, passing touchdowns and interceptions during his 19-year career, winning ArenaBowl XXIV while a member of the Sharks. Garcia was also a two-time Arena Football League Offensive Player of the Year Award recipient, in 2001 and 2011.

High school career
Garcia attended Grant Union High School where he played high school football, and basketball with his father as coach, where he broke John Elway’s California state high school passing, yardage and touchdown records with a two-year prep total of 5,800 yards and 57 touchdown passes.

College career
Garcia went to Washington State University in 1988, and started as a redshirt freshman in 1989, contributing 1,591 yards and 11 touchdown passes, leading the Pac-10 in passing efficiency that year. During that year, quarterbacking duties also were shared by junior Brad Gossen, who threw for 1,372 yards and nine touchdowns in an injury shortened season, prior to Garcia being named the starter. In 1990, a mid-season quarterback controversy erupted when second-year coach Mike Price benched veterans Gossen and Garcia in favor of true-freshman Drew Bledsoe.

After Bledsoe's emergence at Washington State in 1990, Garcia transferred to Sacramento State in Division I-AA and finished his college football career as the starter there, throwing for 1,796 yards and 13 touchdowns in his senior season.

College career statistics

Professional career

Arizona Rattlers
Following his college career, Garcia turned to Arena Football. He played for the Arizona Rattlers in 1995.

Connecticut Coyotes
Garcia was traded to the Connecticut Coyotes during the 1996 season.

New Jersey Red Dogs
Garcia would change teams again in 1997, playing for the New Jersey Red Dogs.

Iowa Barnstomers/New York Dragons
Garcia played for the Red Dogs for a year and a half before joining the Iowa Barnstormers during the 1998 season. Garcia finally settled down in Iowa, and found his greatest success when the Barnstormers became the New York Dragons in 2001. In the 2001 season, Garcia threw a league record 104 touchdown passes, but this was passed by Clint Dolezel in 2006.

San Francisco 49ers
Garcia briefly left the AFL in 2002, when he was signed by the NFL's San Francisco 49ers. He was released after minicamp in June and returned to the Dragons, who finished 3–11 that year.

Return to the Dragons
On February 26, 2006, Garcia suffered a fractured tibia and fibula, ending his season. He was replaced by Juston Wood and later Nick Browder. At the time of the injury, Garcia had thrown more touchdown passes than any pro quarterback, however, Andy Kelly and Clint Dolezel moved ahead of Garcia while he was injured.

On June 2, 2007, Garcia became the fourth quarterback in AFL history to throw 800 touchdowns, joining Dolezel, Sherdrick Bonner, and Kelly.

In 2008, Garcia led the Dragons to the playoffs despite finishing the season with an 8-8 record. In the first round playoff game, Garcia and the Dragons defeated a heavily favored Dallas Desperados team who finished the year at 12-4. Garcia and Dolezel squared off at quarterback against each other, and Garcia out dueled Dolezel throwing nine touchdown passes to Dolezel's seven. The following week, New York lost on the final play of the game to the Philadelphia Soul, who would go on to win ArenaBowl XXII.

Jacksonville Sharks
The Arena Football League suspended operations in 2009. On January 21, 2010, Garcia signed with the expansion Jacksonville Sharks when the Arena Football League reformed in 2010. On May 1, 2010, Garcia threw his 900th touchdown pass to Sale' Key in a 62-60 win over the Tulsa Talons. On June 5, 2010, Garcia became the all-time leader in passing touchdowns in Arena Football history, with 932 touchdown passes thrown. On April 30, 2011, Garcia connected with Jeron Harvey for his 1,000th career touchdown pass. Jacksonville Sharks went on to beat in-state rival Orlando Predators 76-55. On July 22, 2011, Garcia became the first AFL quarterback to cross the 50,000 yard milestone in a 75-56 victory over the Spokane Shock. On August 12, 2011, with two seconds remaining in the 4th quarter, Garcia threw the winning touchdown pass as time expired in ArenaBowl XXIV to win his first Arena Bowl title for the Jacksonville Sharks.

San Antonio Talons
On September 27, 2011, Garcia was officially announced as the first player to sign with the relocated San Antonio Talons franchise.
On March 29, 2012, Garcia was strip sacked on the six yard line but was able to recover the ball and go into the end zone for a fumble recovery score in a 47-34 road victory over the Orlando Predators. Garcia lead the Talons to a 14-4 record, and a Central Division Championship. With the top seed in the National Conference, the Talons were upset 35-34 by the Utah Blaze after Garcia was sacked on 4th and goal with 2:50 remaining in the game. After the 2012 season, the Talons offered a contract to Garcia, but Garcia decided to sign elsewhere.

San Jose SaberCats
On November 8, 2012, Garcia signed with the San Jose Sabercats. On April 22, 2013, after a slow start to the 2013 season (98 for 159, 24 TD's and 13 INT's) the SaberCats announced that they have been assigned former Chicago Rush quarterback Russ Michna on a two-year contract. The SaberCats then placed Garcia on recallable reassignment to make room on the 24-man roster.

Orlando Predators
On April 25, 2013, Garcia was traded, along with Devin Clark, to the Orlando Predators in exchange for Amarri Jackson.

Return to Jacksonville
On February 8, 2014, Garcia was traded back to Jacksonville for Bernard Morris, Matt Marcorelle and Trevis Turner. Garcia started one game for the Sharks, while refusing to report for most of the season.

Los Angeles KISS
On May 12, 2014, Garcia was traded to the Los Angeles KISS for J. J. Raterink.

Career statistics

Coaching career
Garcia was named head coach of the Las Vegas Outlaws of the AFL in September 2014. The Outlaws folded in August 2015.

Coaching record

References

1970 births
Living people
Players of American football from Sacramento, California
American football quarterbacks
Washington State Cougars football players
Sacramento State Hornets football players
Arizona Rattlers players
Connecticut Coyotes players
New Jersey Red Dogs players
Iowa Barnstormers players
New York Dragons players
San Francisco 49ers players
Jacksonville Sharks players
San Antonio Talons players
San Jose SaberCats players
Orlando Predators players
Los Angeles Kiss players
Arena Football League coaches
American sportspeople of Mexican descent
Orlando Rage players
Los Angeles Kiss coaches